Rudolf III ( – 11 June 1419), a member of the House of Ascania, was Duke of Saxe-Wittenberg and Elector of Saxony from 1388 until his death.

Life 
He was probably born at the Saxon Wittenberg residence, the eldest son of Duke Wenceslaus I of Saxe-Wittenberg and his wife Cecilia, daughter of Francesco I da Carrara, Lord of Padua.

Rudolf III took up government after his father's sudden death on 15 May 1388. Rudolf was involved in a long-running dispute with the Archbishopric of Magdeburg. He donated numerous gifts to the Wittenberg All Saints' Church.

Like his father, Rudolf was a loyal supporter of the Imperial House of Luxembourg. In 1419, Emperor Sigismund sent him to Bohemia, in order to quash the Hussite uprising that had begun with the Defenestration of Prague. He died on his way there, probably after being poisoned.

Rudolf was buried in the Franciscan monastery in Wittenberg. His coffin was moved to the crypt of the Wittenberg All Saints' Church in the 19th century, and to the family grave during the Second World War. As he had outlived his male heirs, he was succeeded by his younger brother Albert III.

Marriage and issue 
About 1387/89 Rudolf married with Anna of Meissen (d. 4 July 1395), a daughter of the Wettin landgrave Balthasar of Thuringia and secondly in March 1396 with Barbara (d. 17 May 1435), daughter of the Piast duke Rupert I of Legnica.

He had five children:
 Scholastica (1393–1463), married Duke Jan I of Żagań
 Rudolph (d. 1406),
 Wenceslas (d. 1407),
 Siegmund (d. 1407),
 Barbara (1405–1465), married Margrave John of Brandenburg-Kulmbach

Ancestors

References

External links 
 genealogie-mittelalter.de

Prince-electors of Saxony
Dukes of Saxe-Wittenberg
House of Ascania
1370s births
Year of birth uncertain
1419 deaths
14th-century German nobility
15th-century German nobility